Bassenthwaite is a civil parish in the Borough of Allerdale in Cumbria, England.  It contains 21 listed buildings that are recorded in the National Heritage List for England.  Of these, two are at Grade II*, the middle grade, and the others are at Grade II, the lowest grade.  The parish lies to the east of Bassenthwaite Lake, it contains the village of Bassenthwaite, and is otherwise rural.  Most of the listed buildings are houses or cottages with associated structures, or farmhouses and farm buildings.  The other listed buildings are a church, a former chapel, and a horse engine house


Key

Buildings

References

Citations

Sources

Lists of listed buildings in Cumbria